Brusqeulia jacupiranga is a species of moth of the family Tortricidae. It is found in São Paulo, Brazil.

The wingspan is about 12 mm. The ground colour of the forewings is white with rather large grey suffusions and blackish marginal dots. The markings are grey black with paler areas. The hindwings are grey, but whiter basad.

Etymology
The specific name refers to the type locality, Jacupiranga.

References

Moths described in 2011
Brusqeulia
Moths of South America
Taxa named by Józef Razowski